Dívčice is a municipality and village in České Budějovice District in the South Bohemian Region of the Czech Republic. It has about 600 inhabitants.

Administrative parts
Villages of Česká Lhota, Dubenec, Novosedly and Zbudov are administrative parts of Dívčice.

References

Villages in České Budějovice District